Pretham 2 is a 2018 Indian Malayalam-language comedy horror drama film written, co-produced and directed by Ranjith Sankar. It is a sequel to the 2016 film Pretham. Jayasurya returns for the lead role, alongside a new supporting cast including Durga Krishna,Sidhartha Siva, Amith Chakalakkal, Saniya Iyappan and Dain Davis. Jayasurya co-produced the film with Sankar and also distributed it together. Pretham 2 was released on 21 December 2018.

Plot 
Five members of a Facebook group of cinema enthusiasts decide to get together to meet each others real-life personally and to shoot a short film directed by one of the member, Tapas Menon. They lodge in Mangalassery Mana, an old mansion known to feature in many films and is a tourist destination for the same reason. The team experience paranormal activities during their stay. Meanwhile, mentalist John Don Bosco, their neighbor has come for the Kayakalpa treatment takes an interest in the paranormal phenomena.

It is eventually realized that the spirit causing the problems is of a Manav Matthew. John finds out that Manav was an introvert and was also part of the same Facebook group, under the pseudonym "May Flower". After meeting Manav's mother, it is revealed that Manav was cheated in a credit card fraud by an unknown member of the group. As a result his father Matthew Emmanuel, (the bank manager) was arrested who testified in court assuming Manav's crime in order to save his son's future. Filled with remorse, Manav commits suicide.

John discovers that Manav had been suspecting the five, hence the paranormal activities to find out who. John takes an interest in finding out the culprit. Manav's ghost gives clues on the investigation and it is revealed to John that the culprit uses the Facebook username "JOKER". John creates a Facebook account with the username Sherlock and successfully communicates with JOKER by tricking him into offering hacking lessons to avail free internet. John is assisted by his friend in Police cyber cell, Meera Anwar. John and JOKER decide to meet at the screening of the short film, where almost all the members of the group would arrive.

The short film screened was a detailing of the incidents that happened at the Mangalassery Mana including Manav's story. However, the film ends without a climax. Meera intervenes unveiling the investigation and has her force lockdown the hall. John begins by explaining to the audience that the story of the short film was indeed real and the culprit was in the hall with them. John then shortlists the audience through various mentalism tricks into a five member group. John is confused as he gets the same reactions from all five that was anticipated from JOKER. He eventually finds out all five of them is the "JOKER" as the acronyms of their real names (Jyothish, Ouseppachan, Kalidas, Emil & Renil), make up the pseudonym J.O.K.E.R.

They are arrested and apparently Manav's ghost is seen to be accompanying them. Few days later, John is reading a newspaper headline that reads that the five were found dead under mysterious circumstances in the prison and it happens the next day after Manav's father was released from prison. In the end, Priyalal, Denny, and Shibu from the last film come to Mangalassery Mana and are surprised to see John there, who is about to leave.

Cast

Production 
After the 2018 film Njan Marykutty, Jayasurya and Ranjith Sankar joined together again, for making a sequel to their 2016 comedy horror film Pretham. Pretham 2 marks their sixth collaboration and third consecutive collaboration.

Release 
The film had its theatrical release on 21 December 2018. It was released in the United Arab Emirates on 27 December 2018.

Critical response
The Times of India rated 3.5 out of 5 stars. The New Indian Express rated 3 out of 5 stars and said "Jayasurya and a few cool ideas make this a watchable flick". Sify gave 3.5 out of 5 stars and described it as "a rehash of the earlier formula".

References

External links 
 
 പ്രേതം 2 on M3DB

2010s Malayalam-language films
Indian comedy horror films
Indian sequel films
Films directed by Ranjith Sankar
2018 comedy horror films
Films shot at Varikkasseri Mana
Films shot in Ottapalam
Films shot in Thrissur
Malayalam films in series